is a passenger railway station  located in the town of Nichinan, Tottori Prefecture, Japan. It is operated by the West Japan Railway Company (JR West).

Lines

Station layout
The station consists of one ground-level side platform and one ground level island platform. The station building is connected with the island platform by a footbridge. The station is unattended.

Platforms

Adjacent stations

History
Kami-Iwami Station opened on December 6, 1924. With the privatization of the Japan National Railways (JNR) on April 1, 1987, the station came under the aegis of the West Japan Railway Company.

Passenger statistics
In fiscal 2018, the station was used by an average of 22 passengers daily.

Surrounding area
 Kamiiwami Post Office
 Tottori Prefectural Road No. 8 Niimi Nichinan Line
 Tottori Prefectural Road No. 211 Inokohara Kamiiwami Station Line

See also
List of railway stations in Japan

References

External links 

 Kami-Iwami Station from JR-Odekake.net 

Railway stations in Tottori Prefecture
Stations of West Japan Railway Company
Hakubi Line
Railway stations in Japan opened in 1924
Nichinan, Tottori